The following article presents a summary of the 1987 football (soccer) season in Brazil, which was the 86th season of competitive football in the country.

Campeonato Brasileiro Yellow Module

The 1987 Campeonato Brasileiro Yellow Module was organized by the Brazilian Football Confederation, and did not count with the participation of the most traditional and most popular clubs, which were competing in the Copa União.

Semifinals

|}

Final

Both clubs decided to share the title, but Sport was declared as the Campeonato Brasileiro Yellow Module champions by aggregate score of 3-2, after Guarani withdrew the title on January 22, 1988.

Copa União

The Copa União was organized by the Clube dos 13, but even counting with the most traditional and the most popular Brazilian clubs it is not officially recognized by the Brazilian Football Confederation.

Semifinals

|}

Final

Flamengo declared as the Copa União champions by aggregate score of 2-1.

National Championship Playoff
This playoff was organized by the Brazilian Football Confederation, and consisted of single matches between the champion and runner-up of the Yellow Module (Sport and Guarani) against the champion and runner-up of Copa União (Flamengo and Internacional). Flamengo and Internacional refused to play the competition. As Flamengo and Internacional refused, Sport and Guarani played against each other twice.

Sport declared as the Campeonato Brasileiro champions by the Brazilian Football Confederation by aggregate score of 2-1..

State championship champions

Youth competition champions

Other competition champions

Brazilian clubs in international competitions

Brazil national team
The following table lists all the games played by the Brazil national football team in official competitions and friendly matches during 1987.

Women's football

National team
The Brazil women's national football team did not play any matches in 1987.

Domestic competition champions

References

 Brazilian competitions at RSSSF
 1987 Brazil national team matches at RSSSF
 1986-1996 Brazil women's national team matches at RSSSF

 
Seasons in Brazilian football
Brazil